Say It with Music is a 1932 British musical film directed by Jack Raymond and starring Jack Payne, Percy Marmont and Evelyn Roberts. It was produced by Herbert Wilcox's British and Dominions Films at Elstree Studios. It takes its title from the 1921 song Say It with Music by Irving Berlin which features in the soundtrack, and was an early example of a string of bandleader films produced during the decade.

Synopsis
A former pilot now working as a top bandleader helps a gifted composer recover from amnesia.

Cast
 Jack Payne as Jack Payne
 Percy Marmont as Philip Weston
 Evelyn Roberts as Dr. Longfellow
 Sybil Summerfield as Betty Weston
 Joyce Kennedy as 	Mrs. Weston
 BBC Dance Orchestra as Themselves
 Freddy Schweitzer as himself
 Anna Lee 	
 William Hartnell

References

Bibliography
 Low, Rachael. Filmmaking in 1930s Britain. George Allen & Unwin, 1985.
 Wood, Linda. British Films, 1927-1939. British Film Institute, 1986.
 Wright, Adrian. Cheer Up!: British Musical Films 1929-1945. The Boydell Press, 2020.

External links

1932 films
British musical films
1932 musical films
Films directed by Jack Raymond
British black-and-white films
British and Dominions Studios films
Films shot at Imperial Studios, Elstree
1930s English-language films
1930s British films